Falls may refer to:

Places
 Waterfalls or rapids
 Falls, North Carolina, USA
 Falls, West Virginia, USA

Other uses
 The ropes or wires, fed through davits, that are used to secure and lower a ship's lifeboats.
 Falls (surname)
 The sepals of the Iris flower
 Falls in older adults

See also 

 Meteorite falls
 Belfast Falls (disambiguation)
 Falls Road, Belfast in Belfast, Northern Ireland
 Belfast Falls (Northern Ireland Parliament constituency)
 Belfast Falls (UK Parliament constituency)
 Falls Festival
 Blood Falls, an outflow of an iron oxide tainted plume of melting salty water occurring at the Taylor Glacier in the McMurdo Dry Valleys in Antarctica
 Falls Airport (disambiguation)
 Falls City (disambiguation)
 Falls Creek (disambiguation)
 Falls River (disambiguation)
 Falls Township (disambiguation)
 The Falls (disambiguation)
 Fall (disambiguation)
 The Fall (disambiguation)
 Falling (disambiguation)
 Fals (disambiguation)